Olanlar Oldu is a 2017 Turkish film. It was released in Turkey by BKM Film on 10 January 2017.

Plot
Zafer, a sailor living with his mother Döndü in a coastal village in Izmir, has just separated from his girlfriend Mehtap whose father is also a sailor. While Döndü and her friend, Fahriye try to help Zafer to marry someone and have his own family, a famous and talented actress, Aslı surprisingly attends Zafer's boat tour. Then Asli and Zafer find themselves getting to know each other.

Cast
Ata Demirer - Zafer/Döndü
Tuvana Türkay- Asli
Salih Kalyon
Ülkü Duru
Derya Alabora - Auntula
Seda Güven - Mehtap
Recep Renan Bilek 
Toprak Sergen
Ali Yoğurtçuoğlu
Bige Önal as Gizem

References

External links

2017 films
2010s Turkish-language films
Turkish comedy films
Films set in İzmir
Films shot in İzmir